Below are the rosters for the UEFA U-17 Championship 2008 tournament in Turkey. Players name marked in bold went on to earn full international caps.

Players' ages as of the tournament's opening day (4 May 2008).

Group A

Head coach: Albert Stuivenberg

Head coach: Dejan Đurđević

Head coach: Ross Mathie

Head coach: Şenol Ustaömer

Group B

Head coach: Francis Smerecki

Head coach: Sean McCaffrey

Head coach: Juan Santisteban

Head coach: Yves Débonnaire

Footnotes

Squads
UEFA European Under-17 Championship squads